The Estill Shale is a geologic formation in Ohio. It dates back to the Silurian.

References
 Generalized Stratigraphic Chart for Ohio

Silurian Ohio